Rommel Fernández Gutiérrez (15 January 1966 – 6 May 1993) was a Panamanian footballer who played as a striker.

The second Panamanian to play in Europe, he spent almost his entire professional career in Spain, amassing La Liga totals of 104 games and 32 goals – 162/56 both major levels combined – in representation of four teams. In 1993, he died in a car accident, at the age of just 27.

Club career
Fernández was born in the Panama City neighborhood of El Chorrillo. In 1987 the 21-year-old signed for CD Tenerife in Spain from Alianza, scoring a career-best 18 goals in his second season as the Canary Islands side was promoted to La Liga for the second time in its history; in the following years he also netted in double digits as the club retained its top division status – in the 1989–90 campaign he was named Best South American Player (sic) in the Spanish League and, the following year, was voted best Ibero-American player in the competition by news agency EFE, receiving the Trofeo EFE.

Nicknamed "The Panzer", Fernández moved to Valencia CF in 1991, but was used mostly as a backup in his only season, scoring just two goals. Subsequently he joined Albacete Balompié on loan, helping the Castile-La Mancha team retain its first division status in its second season ever and scoring his 50th league goal in the process, against former club Tenerife.

International career
Fernández represented Panama numerous times, making his debut in the late 80's. In 1986, during a trip with the national team to Spain to participate in the Mundialito de la Emigración, a tournament where Tenerife played a select squad of players with Spanish ancestry, he played well enough to be offered a contract by the hosts.

Fernández's last match with Panama was a 1–5 defeat in Costa Rica for the 1994 FIFA World Cup qualifiers, on 23 August 1992.

Death
On 6 May 1993, after returning from a meal with his Albacete teammates, Fernández died in a car accident just outside Albacete, after losing control of his car and hitting his head on a tree. His cousin Ronny Rojo was also travelling with him, but emerged unharmed.

Legacy
Estadio Revolución was renamed Estadio Rommel Fernández, in Fernández's honour.

References

External links

1966 births
1993 deaths
People from Panamá District
Panamanian people of Spanish descent
Panamanian footballers
Association football forwards
La Liga players
Segunda División players
CD Tenerife players
Valencia CF players
Albacete Balompié players
Panama international footballers
Panamanian expatriate footballers
Expatriate footballers in Spain
Panamanian expatriate sportspeople in Spain
Road incident deaths in Spain